The Bouenguidi River is a river in Gabon. It enters the Lolo River. The Bouenguidi River passes through Koulamoutou.

Its main tributary is the Lebiyou River.

References 

 Lerique Jacques. 1983. Hydrographie-Hydrologie. in Geographie et Cartographie du Gabon, Atlas Illustré led by The Ministère de l'Education Nationale de la Republique Gabonaise. Pg 14–15. Paris, France: Edicef.

Rivers of Gabon